Libjo, officially the Municipality of Libjo (Surigaonon: Lungsod nan Libjo; ;), is a 5th class municipality in the province of Dinagat Islands, Philippines. According to the 2020 census, it has a population of 18,051 people.

It is formerly known as Albor.

History

The town became a part of the province of Dinagat Islands in December 2006, when the province was created from Surigao del Norte by Republic Act No. 9355. However, in February 2010, the Supreme Court ruled that the law was unconstitutional, as the necessary requirements for provincial land area and population were not met. The town reverted to Surigao del Norte. On October 24, 2012, however, the Supreme Court reversed its ruling from the previous year, and upheld the constitutionality of RA 9355 and the creation of Dinagat Islands as a province.

Geography

Barangays
Libjo is politically subdivided into 16 barangays.

Climate

Demographics

Economy

See also
List of renamed cities and municipalities in the Philippines

References

External links

 Libjo Profile at the DTI Cities and Municipalities Competitive Index
 [ Philippine Standard Geographic Code]

Municipalities of Dinagat Islands